Hrastovica may refer to:

 Hrastovica, Mokronog-Trebelno, a village in southeastern Slovenia
 Hrastovica, Croatia, a village near Petrinja, Croatia